Al Hoota Cave is a cave located in Al-Hamra', Ad Dakhiliyah Governorate, Oman, that is  long. The cave was first discovered by locals several hundred years ago and was officially opened as a tourist destination in December 2006.

The Omani blind cave fish lives in this cave system.
Stalagmites from this cave yield data on the palaeoclimate.

References

External links
 Official website

Caves of Oman
Wild caves